Wheeleria parviflorellus is a moth of the family Pterophoridae that is found in Afghanistan. It was described by Ernst Arenberger in 1981.

The ground colour is white. Adults are on wing from May to July.

The larvae feed on Stachys parviflora.

References

Moths described in 1981
Pterophorini
Endemic fauna of Afghanistan
Moths of Asia